Llandudno Victoria tram stop is the lower terminus of the Great Orme Tramway, situated in the centre of the town of Llandudno, Wales. The Great Orme Tramway is a funicular, which connects this terminus to the Halfway and Summit stops on the Great Orme.

Llandudno railway station, the town's main line station, is a 15-minute walk from Victoria.

Trams run approximately every twenty minutes, increasing to every ten minutes in peak hours, to Halfway station, where passengers change cars to the summit. Trams run seasonally only, from late March to late October.

References

Great Orme Tramway
Railway stations in Conwy County Borough